Reed House may refer to:

in the United States
(by state then city)
William Reed House, Birmingham, Alabama, listed on the National Register of Historic Places (NRHP) in Birmingham
Will Reed Farm House, Alleene, Arkansas
Reed House (Leipsic, Delaware)
Jehu Reed House, Little Heaven, Delaware
Mrs. Kersey Coates Reed House, Lake Forest, Illinois
Reed-Dossey House, Brownsville, Kentucky
Frederick Reed House, Falmouth, Kentucky, NRHP-listed in Pendleton County
Newdigate-Reed House, Maysville, Kentucky
Reed Farmstead Log Dependencies, Husser, Louisiana, NRHP-listed in Tangipahoa Parish
G. W. Reed Travellers Home, Benton, Maine
Philo Reed House, Fort Fairfield, Maine
Thomas Brackett Reed House, Portland, Maine
Robert Reed House, Woolrich, Maine
Col. Isaac G. Reed House, Waldoboro, Maine
Reed's Creek Farm, Centreville, Maryland
Fowle-Reed-Wyman House, Arlington, Massachusetts
Reed-Wood Place, Littleton, Massachusetts
Reed and Barton Complex, Taunton, Massachusetts
Frank Reed Three-Decker, Worcester, Massachusetts
Timothy Reed House, Quincy, Massachusetts
Pleasant Reed House, Biloxi, Mississippi
Reed Log House, Eminence, Missouri
Wilber T. Reed House, Auburn, Nebraska
Mary Reed House, Omaha, Nebraska, listed as an Omaha Landmark
Isaac Reed House, Newport, New Hampshire
Samuel Harrison Reed House, Asheville, North Carolina
James Reed House, Fredericktown, Ohio, NRHP-listed in Knox County
Henry Reed, Jr., House, Maumee, Ohio, NRHP-listed in Lucas County
C.A. Reed House, Ravenna, Ohio, NRHP-listed in Portage County
Reed-Wells House, Portland, Oregon
Rosamond Coursen and Walter R. Reed House, Portland, Oregon
Samuel G. Reed House, Portland, Oregon
Charles Manning Reed Mansion, Erie, Pennsylvania
Reed House, now called Davis Memorial Hall at Washington & Jefferson College, in Washington, Pennsylvania
Brame-Reed House, Shelbyville, Tennessee
Thomas B. Reed House, Houston, Texas, NRHP-listed in Harris County
Walter Reed Birthplace, Belroi, Virginia

See also
Reed Hall, Emsworth, Pennsylvania, part of Dixmont State Hospital, NRHP-listed